Master of the Books is the second novel in a fantasy series by James Moloney. It is the sequel to The Book of Lies, which was released on 25 May 2004.

Plot
The book mostly deals with Fergus's attempts to kill Damon, who tracks Damon all over the Mortal Kingdoms. When Marcel puts a curse over Elster to prove that Fergus would never kill his father, the curse backfires on Fergus, putting him in mortal danger, and Marcel journeys to Noam to try and undo the curse. However, along the way, he discovers that Fergus is not the only person that needs Marcel's help.

Main characters
Prince Marcel [Robert]
Princess Catherine [Nicola]
Prince Edwin [Fergus]
King Pelham,
Damon &
Termagant

External links
HarperCollins page about the book

2007 Australian novels
Children's fantasy novels
Australian children's novels
Australian fantasy novels
Novels by James Moloney
HarperCollins books
2004 children's books